Wild, Wild World of Animals is a syndicated American television show that features wildlife and nature documentaries. It was originally produced from 1973 until 1978, and was narrated by William Conrad. The soundtrack was composed by Gerhard Trede and Beatrice Witkin. Produced by Time-Life Television, the series features documentaries produced by various production companies worldwide, including the BBC. Reruns were later aired by the USA Network and Australia's ABC during the 1980s.

A series of hardbound books published by Time-Life was also published during this period to accompany the series.

HBO owns the series today; while the series has been made available on home videotape worldwide, the series has not seen release on DVD or Blu-ray formats. HBO currently offers clips of the series to commercial customers.

References

External links
 HBO Archive: "Wildlife Royalty Free Collection" (featuring clips from Wild, Wild World of Animals)
 

1973 American television series debuts
1978 American television series endings
1970s American documentary television series
Nature educational television series
Documentaries about animals
Time Life book series